Belida is a genus of flies in the family Tachinidae.

Species
B. angelicae (Meigen, 1824)
B. chaetoneura (Coquillett, 1897)
B. dexina (Townsend, 1912)
B. latifrons (Jacentkovsky, 1944)
B. longicornis Shima, 1979
B. pusilla (Reinhard, 1953)

References

Exoristinae
Tachinidae genera
Taxa named by Jean-Baptiste Robineau-Desvoidy